West Indies: The Fugitive Slaves of Liberty is a 1979 Algerian-Mauritanian French-language drama film directed by Med Hondo. The plot of the film was adopted from a novel titled "Les Negriers" (The Slavers) which was written by Daniel Boukman. The film is highly regarded as a landmark film in the history of African cinema as it was made with a lavish budget of US$1.35 million, making it as one of the biggest budgeted African films ever to be made. The film was set in the backdrop of colonial West Indies  which was under the French imperialism. The film was set on a French owned slave ship and had its theatrical release in 1979.

Cast 

 Cyril Aventurin
 Fernand Berset
 Roland Bertin
 Gérard Bloncourt
 Toto Bissainthe
 Hélène Vincent

References

External links 

 

1979 films
1979 drama films
Mauritanian drama films
Algerian drama films
French drama films
1970s French-language films
Films shot in Mauritania
1970s French films